Apsonsi is a half-woman half-lion mythical creature from Thai mythology. Apsonsi is one of the many hybrid creatures depicted in ancient South and Southeast Asian folklore. Also called Apsonsingh, Apsonsingha, Apsarasingha or Apsarasingh, being the compound of an Apsara (Apson) and a singha (singh), that is a female nymph and a lion. The combination of a male angel and a lion is called Thepnorasi.  It is comparable to the Manussiha, a half-lion half-man Burmese mythical creature.

In Legend, Apsonsi lived in Himavanta, an invisible mythical forest set deep in the Himalaya Mountains. The Apsonsi is a half-woman, half-lion figure believed to be the protector from harm. Apsonsi figures stand guard at Wat Phra Kaew (The Emerald Buddha Temple), a historic site in Bangkok, Thailand.

See also
 Manussiha 
 Kinnara 
 Sphinx
 Thai folklore

Sources
 
 

Thai legendary creatures
Thai culture